Stockbridge Down is a  biological Site of Special Scientific Interest east of Stockbridge in Hampshire. It is a Nature Conservation Review site, Grade 2. It is owned by the National Trust and part of it is a Scheduled Monument, with an Iron Age hillfort and fourteen Bronze Age burial mounds.

This site has a variety of scrub and grassland habitats on a north-west facing slope of chalk and a clay-with-flints plateau. There is a diverse range of butterflies, such as chalk-hill blue, marbled white and dark green fritillary, while moths include the oblique striped.

References

Sites of Special Scientific Interest in Hampshire
National Trust properties in Hampshire
Nature Conservation Review sites